Jaroslav Kalla (born December 7, 1979) is a Czech professional ice hockey player. He played with HC Kladno in the Czech Extraliga during the 2010–11 Czech Extraliga season.

References

External links

1979 births
Czech ice hockey forwards
HC Berounští Medvědi players
HC Karlovy Vary players
HC Slavia Praha players
HC Slovan Ústečtí Lvi players
HC Sparta Praha players
HC Stadion Litoměřice players
HK Neman Grodno players
HKM Zvolen players
Leksands IF players
Motor České Budějovice players
MsHK Žilina players
Rytíři Kladno players
Living people
Sportspeople from Kladno
Czech expatriate sportspeople in Belarus
Expatriate ice hockey players in Belarus
Czech expatriate ice hockey players in Slovakia
Czech expatriate ice hockey players in Sweden